Dimethyl dithiophosphoric acid is the organophosphorus compound with the formula (CH3O)2PS2H.  It is the processor for production of the organothiophosphate insecticide Malathion. Although samples can appear dark, the compound is a colorless, distillable liquid.

It is prepared by treating phosphorus pentasulfide with methanol:
P2S5  +  4 CH3OH    →  2 (CH3O)2PS2H  +  H2S

See also
 Ammonium diethyl dithiophosphate
 Diethyl dithiophosphoric acid
 Zinc dithiophosphate

References 

Organothiophosphate esters
Methoxy compounds